Baryplegma pertusum is a species of tephritid or fruit flies in the genus Baryplegma of the family Tephritidae.

Distribution
Mexico, Belize, Guatemala, Nicaragua, Costa Rica, Panama, Colombia, Venezuela.

References

Tephritinae
Insects described in 1934
Diptera of North America
Diptera of South America